Kenneth Crowther (17 December 1924 – June 1994) was an English professional footballer who played as a right half for Bradford (Park Avenue) and Rochdale.

References

1924 births
1994 deaths
Footballers from Halifax, West Yorkshire
English footballers
Association football midfielders
Halifax Town A.F.C. players
Burnley F.C. players
Bradford (Park Avenue) A.F.C. players
Rochdale A.F.C. players
Nelson F.C. players
English Football League players